Rudy Briones Lingganay Jr. (born August 15, 1986 in Zamboanga City) is a Filipino professional basketball player for Zamboanga Valientes of the ASEAN Basketball League (ABL).

On November 27, 2014, he was traded to the NLEX Road Warriors in exchange for Eliud Poligrates.

PBA career statistics

Correct as of 2017–18 season

Season-by-season averages

|-
| align=left | 
| align=left | Powerade
| 43 || 12.1 || .442 || .314 || .795 || 1.6 || 1.7 || .5 || .0 || 4.4
|-
| align=left | 
| align=left | GlobalPort
| 27 || 13.4 || .378 || .300 || .833 || 1.5 || 1.1 || .7 || .0 || 3.5
|-
| align=left | 
| align=left | GlobalPort
| 16 || 11.1 || .425 || .357 || .000 || 1.4 || .9 || .3 || .0 || 2.8
|-
| align=left | 
| align=left | Kia / NLEX
| 32 || 16.9 || .404 || .296 || .821 || 1.9 || 1.6 || .6 || .0 || 5.2
|-
| align=left | 
| align=left | TNT
| 8 || 6.5 || .333 || .444 || .667 || 1.1 || 1.0 || .0 || .0 || 2.3
|-
| align=left | Career
| align=left |
| 126 || 12.0 || .396 || .342 || .623 || 1.5 || 1.3 || .4 || .0 || 3.6

References

1986 births
Living people
ASEAN Basketball League players
Basketball players from Zamboanga del Sur
Filipino expatriate basketball people in Indonesia
Filipino expatriate basketball people in Malaysia
Filipino men's basketball players
NorthPort Batang Pier players
Terrafirma Dyip players
NLEX Road Warriors players
Powerade Tigers players
Point guards
Sportspeople from Zamboanga City
TNT Tropang Giga players
UE Red Warriors basketball players
Kuala Lumpur Dragons players
Maharlika Pilipinas Basketball League players
Filipino men's 3x3 basketball players
Filipino expatriate basketball people in Thailand

Zamboanga Valientes players